The 2000 Liga Sudamericana de Básquetbol, or 2000 FIBA South American League, was the fifth edition of the second-tier tournament for professional basketball clubs from South America. The tournament began on 16 February 2000, and finished on 17 April 2000. Brazilian team Vasco da Gama won their second title, defeating Argentine club Atenas in the Grand Finals.

Format
Teams were split into four groups of four teams each, and played each other in a round-robin format. The top two teams from each group advanced to the final stage, a best-of-three direct playoff elimination in the quarterfinals and the semifinals, and a best-of-five elimination series in the Grand Finals, where the champion was decided.

Teams

Group stage

Group A

Group B

Group C

Group D

Final stage

Quarterfinals

Game 1

Game 2

Game 3

Semifinals

Game 1

Game 2

Grand Finals

Finals rosters
Vasco da Gama: Charles Byrd, Demétrius Conrado Ferraciú, Rogério Klafke, Sandro Varejão, Jose Vargas - Helinho. Coach: Hélio Rubens 

Atenas Cordoba: Marcelo Milanesio, Leandro Palladino, Héctor Campana, Jason Osborne - Leonardo Gutierrez. Coach: Pablo Coleffi

Season MVP: Jose Vargas

References

Liga Sudamericana
2000